The 1990–91 Israel State Cup (Gvia HaMedina) was the 52nd season of Israel's nationwide football cup competition and the 37th after the Israeli Declaration of Independence.

The competition was won by Maccabi Haifa who have beaten Hapoel Petah Tikva 3–1 in the final.

Results

Eighth Round

Byes: Hapoel Kiryat Ono, Hapoel Tiberias, Bnei Hatzor, Maccabi Ironi Ashdod.

Round of 16

|}

Quarter-finals

|}

Semi-finals

Final

References
100 Years of Football 1906-2006, Elisha Shohat (Israel), 2006, pp. 283-4
 Replay of the last State Cup final Haaretz, February 1991, cs.bgu.ac.il 
 Search results of matches for the 1990/1991 season at the State Cup Maccabi Haifa 
 Cup matches part 3  Effi Levy, Maccabi Jaffa 
 1990/1991 season Hapoel Petah Tikva Museum 
 Eighth round of the State Cup Haaretz, February 1991, cs.bgu.ac.il 
 1990/1991 season Bnei Yehuda Museum 
 Maccabi Yanve - Beitar Tel Aviv 0-1 Haaretz, February 1991, cs.bgu.ac.il 
 Fixtures Maccabi Tel Aviv 
 Hapoel Be'er Sheva - Maccabi Petah Tikva 1-2 Haaretz, February 1991, cs.bgu.ac.il 

Israel State Cup
State Cup
Israel State Cup seasons